WJSR (91.1 FM, "91.1 The Edge") was an American non-commercial educational College radio station licensed to serve the community of Birmingham, Alabama. The station was owned and operated by Jefferson State Community College.

Programming
WJSR broadcast a college radio format to the greater Birmingham area. WJSR was a student-run station which operated five days a week, Monday through Friday, when classes were in session.

History
WJSR went on the air in 1979 operating as only 10 watts of effective radiated power. In 1985 the station increased to 120 watts. WJSR was broadcasting at 230 watts when it went silent.

Although WJSR was licensed to Birmingham, its signal was very difficult to receive in Birmingham itself, as the station shared the frequency with Samford University's WVSU-FM, which is the dominant station on the 91.1 frequency in most of the immediate Birmingham area. WJSR's transmitter was located on the west side of Center Point, Alabama.

WJSR ceased broadcasting in July 2014 and on July 11, 2014, license holder Jefferson State Community College informed the FCC that it had fallen silent and petitioned the FCC to cancel its broadcast license.

References

External links

JSR
1979 establishments in Alabama
Jefferson County, Alabama
Radio stations established in 1979
Radio stations disestablished in 2014
2014 disestablishments in Alabama
Defunct radio stations in the United States
JSR